Mathematics Presents - Wu-Tang Clan & Friends Unreleased is a compilation produced by rap music producer Mathematics. It was released on February 6, 2007 under label Nature Sounds. It contains unreleased songs by Wu-Tang Clan and their affiliates.

Later, in 2010, Mathematics produced Return of the Wu and Friends.

Track listing

Reception 

Impose described the collection as "a 20-tuned compilation of remixes, B-sides and obscure Wu material", with a "continuous swinging baseline", a "soulful musical setting which provide a fine contrast to the rappers lyrical grit", and "sounds that stem from the comforting to the intimidating". Nevertheless, the magazine also described the collection as "appeal[ing] more to the Wu-head than the casual Wu-Tang fan".

Complex called one song from the collection, Maxine (Remix), "told over a heavy-duty 1970s experience" but "smooth[ed ]out considerably with an easy-like-Sunday-morning groove".

HipHopDX praised the compilation as a "testament to the knob twisting skills of Mathematics", but also stated that "the Clan's core members don’t make enough unheard appearances on the disc".

Notes

References 

Hip hop compilation albums
Albums produced by Mathematics
2007 compilation albums
Nature Sounds compilation albums